Frans Vos (22 February 1925 – 14 April 2001) was a Dutch racing cyclist. He rode in the 1950 Tour de France.

References

1925 births
2001 deaths
Dutch male cyclists
Place of birth missing